Jiří Trnka (2 December 1926 – 1 March 2005) was a Czechoslovak football defender who played for Czechoslovakia in the 1954 FIFA World Cup. He also played for Dukla Prague.

References

External links
 
 
 

1926 births
2005 deaths
Czech footballers
Czechoslovak footballers
Czechoslovakia international footballers
Association football defenders
Dukla Prague footballers
1954 FIFA World Cup players